The Roman Catholic Archdiocese of Castries is an archdiocese of the Latin Church of the Roman Catholic Church in the Caribbean. The archdiocese consists of the entirety of the former British dependency of Saint Lucia and is a metropolitan see, the suffragans of the Castries Province being the Dioceses of Roseau, Saint George's in Grenada, St. John's-Basseterre and Kingstown. The archdiocese is a member of the Antilles Episcopal Conference.

Erected as the Diocese of Castries in 1956 from its then-metropolitan see of Port of Spain, it was elevated to archdiocese in November 1974.

The  archbishop is Gabriel Malzaire The cathedral is the Cathedral Basilica of the Immaculate Conception, a minor basilica located in Derek Walcott Square, Castries.

Bishops

Ordinaries
Charles Alphonse H.J. Gachet, F.M.I. (1957–1974) 
Patrick Webster, O.S.B. (1974–1979) 
Kelvin Edward Felix (1981–2008); elevated to Cardinal in 2014
Robert Rivas, O.P. (2008–2022)
Gabriel Malzaire (2022–present)

Coadjutor archbishop
Robert Rivas, O.P. (2007-2008)

Other priest of this diocese who became bishop
Gabriel Malzaire, appointed Bishop of Roseau, Dominica, Antilles in 2002

See also
St. Joseph the Worker Church, Gros Islet

References

External links

Catholic Hierarchy

Catholic Church in Saint Lucia
Organisations based in Saint Lucia
Christian organizations established in 1956
Roman Catholic dioceses in the Caribbean
Roman Catholic dioceses and prelatures established in the 20th century
A